van Berlo is a surname. Notable people with the surname include:

Diana van Berlo (born 1966), Dutch singer
Jay van Berlo (born 1988), Australian rules footballer
Nathan van Berlo (born 1986), Australian rules footballer

Dutch-language surnames
Surnames of Dutch origin